In mathematics, the resolvent formalism is a technique for applying concepts from complex analysis to the study of the spectrum of operators on Banach spaces and more general spaces. Formal justification for the manipulations can be found in the framework of holomorphic functional calculus.

The resolvent captures the spectral properties of an operator in the analytic structure of the functional. Given an operator , the resolvent may be defined as
 

Among other uses, the resolvent may be used to solve the inhomogeneous Fredholm integral equations; a commonly used approach is a series solution, the Liouville–Neumann series.

The resolvent of  can be used to directly obtain information about the spectral decomposition
For example, suppose   is an isolated eigenvalue in the 
That is, suppose there exists a simple closed curve  
Then the residue 
 

Thus, for example, if  is a Hermitian, then  is a one-parameter group of unitary operators. Whenever , the resolvent of A at z can be expressed as the Laplace transform
 
where the integral is taken along the ray .

History
Liouville–Neumann series) was by Ivar Fredholm, in a landmark 1903 paper in Acta Mathematica that helped establish modern operator theory.  

The name resolvent was given by David Hilbert.

Resolvent identity

The second resolvent identity is a generalization of the first resolvent identity, above, useful for comparing the resolvents of two distinct operators.

Compact resolvent
When studying a closed unbounded operator     :  →  on a Hilbert space  , if there exists  such that  is a compact operator, we say that   has compact resolvent. Also,  has no finite accumulation point.

See also
 Resolvent set
 Stone's theorem on one-parameter unitary groups    
 Holomorphic functional calculus
 Spectral theory
 Compact operator
Laplace transform
Fredholm theory
 Liouville–Neumann series
Decomposition of spectrum (functional analysis)
Limiting absorption principle

References 

 
 
 .
 .

Fredholm theory
Formalism (deductive)
Mathematical physics